The Sloop Inn is the name of many public houses in the UK:

The Sloop Inn, St Ives, Cornwall
Sloop Inn, Porthgain
The Sloop Inn, Bantham
The Sloop Inn, Barton-Upon-Humber
The Sloop Inn, Beckside at Beverley
The Sloop Inn, Sankey Bridges
The Sloop Inn, Temple Hirst
The Sloop Inn, Thurlestone